Najim Abdullah al-Jubouri is an Iraqi Major General and governor. Al-Jubouri commanded Iraqi Army forces attempting to oust the forces of the Islamic State of Iraq and the Levant from the Nineveh Governorate during the Battle of Mosul (2016–2017). As of 2020 he is serving as the governor of the Province of Nineveh.

Biography
Jubouri was born on 28 October 1956 in Qayyarah, south of Mosul. He received his primary education in Samarra and Kut. He joined the military college in 1976 and graduated from the rank as first lieutenant later in 1979. He participated in Iran–Iraq War and the 1991 Gulf War. He continued to serve in the military until the US invasion of Iraq and subsequent fall of the Hussein regime in 2003.

Najim Abdullah al-Jubouri is a veteran of the Ba'athist Iraqi Army and post-invasion Iraqi Army. Jubouri was mayor of the city of Tal Afar from June 2005 to 2008, and assisted coalition forces in counter-insurgency operations. After that, he moved to the United States in 2008 but returned to Iraq later in 2015 after living in Virginia for eight years. In 2009, he was a researcher at the National Defense University in Washington DC after having graduated that same year.

Iraqi Civil War 
During the Iraqi Civil War, Al-Jubouri commanded Iraqi Army forces attempting to oust the forces of the Islamic State of Iraq and the Levant from the Nineveh Governorate during the Battle of Mosul (2016–2017). As of 2020 he is serving as the governor of the Province of Nineveh.

References

Iraqi generals
Iraqi military personnel
Living people
1956 births